Zaid Abbaas (Arabic: زيد عباس; born November 21, 1983 in Nablus) is a Jordanian retired professional basketball player. He last played for Al Ahli of the Jordanian Premier Basketball League.  He also was a member of the Jordan men's national basketball team.

Abbaas competed with the Jordanian team at the FIBA Asia Championship 2007 and FIBA Asia Championship 2009.  In 2009, Abbaas helped the Jordanian team to a national best third-place finish by averaging 13.8 points and a team-leading 8.8 rebounds per game.  The third-place finish meant that Jordan qualified for its first ever FIBA World Championship.

On the heels of his strong 2009 Asia Championship performance, Abbaas signed with Chinese Basketball Association team Shanghai Sharks, where he spent the 2009-10 season. Abbaas played for the Beijing Ducks for the 2010-11 season. For the 2011-12 season, Abbaas played for Fujian Xunxing.

He is the younger brother of Islam Abbas.

References

1983 births
Living people
Beijing Ducks players
Beijing Royal Fighters players
Fujian Sturgeons players
Nanjing Tongxi Monkey Kings players
Jordanian men's basketball players
People from Nablus
Shandong Hi-Speed Kirin players
Shanghai Sharks players
Shanxi Loongs players
Basketball players at the 2006 Asian Games
Power forwards (basketball)
Small forwards
Tianjin Pioneers players
2010 FIBA World Championship players
Asian Games competitors for Jordan
2019 FIBA Basketball World Cup players